Bayan'obo Mining District (Mongolian:     Bayan Oboɣ-a Aɣurqai-yin toɣoriɣ, Баян-Овоо Уурхайн тойрог), or Baiyun-Obo or Baiyun'ebo, is a mining district in the west of Inner Mongolia, People's Republic of China.

The mines north of the town are the largest deposits of rare-earth elements yet found and, as of 2005, responsible for 45% of global rare-earth element production.

In the satellite image at right, vegetation appears red, grassland is light brown, rocks are black, and water surfaces are green. Two circular open-pit mines are visible, as well as a number of tailings ponds and tailings piles.

Economic geology
China produced about 81,000 tons of rare-earth metals in 2001; the number jumped to about 120,000 by 2006. According to the Chinese Society of Rare Earths,  of waste gas—containing dust concentrate, hydrofluoric acid, sulfur dioxide, and sulfuric acid—are released with every ton of rare metals that are mined. Approximately  of acidic wastewater, plus about a ton of radioactive waste residue are also produced.

Mine deposit 
Very large rare-earth elements (REE) Fe-Nb deposit (Bayan-Obo type), discovered as an iron deposit in 1927. REE minerals were discovered in 1936, and niobium-bearing ores in the late 1950s. Reserves are estimated at more than 40 million tons of REE minerals grading at 3–5.4% REE  (70% of world's known REE reserves), 1 million tons of Nb2O5 and 470 million tons of iron. The deposit also contains an estimated 130 million tons of fluorite.

Bayan'obo is the world's largest known REE deposit. The fluorite content of the ores also makes it the world's largest fluorite deposit.

The deposit occurs in an east–west trending Mesoproterozoic rift zone along the northern margin of the Sino-Korean Craton. Host strata are quartzite, slate, limestone, and dolomite. Dolomite is the main host rock. The orebodies are stratiform and lenticular, with masses, bands, layers, veins, and disseminations. Besides clear features of hydrothermal mineralization, the deposit also exhibits Mg, Fe, Na and F metasomatism. Sm-Nd monazite isochron age for bastnaesite and riebeckite  is 1200 to 1300 Ma, whereas Th-Pb and Sm-Nd age of Ba-REE-F carbonates and aeschynite is 474 to 402 Ma.

See also
 Nanling Mountains
Mountain Pass Mine

References

Further reading
 The Sedimentary Carbonate-Hosted Giant Bayan Obo REE-Fe-Nb Ore Deposit of Inner Mongolia, China: A Cornerstone Example for Giant Polymetallic Ore Deposits of Hydrothermal Origin, by E.C.T. Chao et al.. 1997, USGS Bulletin 2143. Full text online

Baotou
Mining communities in China
Rare earth mines
Carbonatite occurrences
County-level divisions of Inner Mongolia